The 1975 Artistic Gymnastics World Cup was held in London, England in 1975.

Medal winners

References

1975
Artistic Gymnastics World Cup
International gymnastics competitions hosted by the United Kingdom
1978 in British sport